Giovanni Battista Revello (1672–1732), also called il Mustacchi, was an Italian painter of the Baroque period. He painted both quadratura and still-life.

He was born in Recco near Genoa and studied under Enrico Haffner, and formed a close friendship with Francesco Costa. For twenty years they worked painting landscape elements for other historical painters.

Revello gained his nickname due to his unusual habit of painting moustaches on his works.
He is said to have traveled to Tunisia to paint for the Bey. His son Paolo as also a painter (died in 1763).

References

1672 births
1732 deaths
17th-century Italian painters
Italian male painters
18th-century Italian painters
Italian Baroque painters
Painters from Genoa
Italian still life painters
18th-century Italian male artists